Georgia Page (born 21 March 1995) is an Australian rugby league footballer who plays as a . She previously played for the St George Illawarra Dragons and Newcastle Knights in the NRL Women's Premiership, Cronulla-Sutherland Sharks in the NSWRL Women's Premiership and played rugby union for the Melbourne Rebels in the Super W.

Background
Born in Windsor, New South Wales, Page played track and field, tennis and basketball growing up before attending a rugby union talent identification day as a teenager. From there, she was offered a five-year scholarship to Lindenwood University in St. Charles, Missouri, where she played for their rugby union team.

Playing career

Rugby union
After one year, Page returned to Australia and played rugby for Bond University. In 2019, she played for the Melbourne Rebels in the Super W.

Rugby league
In 2020, Page switched to rugby league, playing for the Cronulla-Sutherland Sharks in the NSWRL Women's Premiership.

On 23 September 2020, Page joined the St George Illawarra Dragons NRL Women's Premiership team. In Round 2 of the 2020 NRLW season, Page made her debut for the Dragons in an 18–4 loss to the Brisbane Broncos.

On 25 November 2021, Page signed with the Newcastle Knights to be a part of their inaugural NRLW squad.

In round 1 of the delayed 2021 NRL Women's season, Page made her club debut for the Knights against the Parramatta Eels. She played in 4 matches for the Knights, before parting ways with the club at the end of the season.

References

External links
Newcastle Knights profile
St George Illawarra Dragons profile

1995 births
Living people
Australian female rugby union players
Australian female rugby league players
Australia women's national rugby league team players
Rugby league second-rows
St. George Illawarra Dragons (NRLW) players
Newcastle Knights (NRLW) players
20th-century Australian women
21st-century Australian women